The Civil Resolution Tribunal (CRT) is Canada's first online tribunal, located in British Columbia (BC), Canada. It is one of the first examples in the world of online dispute resolution (ODR) being incorporated into the public justice system. The CRT was established under the Civil Resolution Tribunal Act (2012), which was amended in 2015. The CRT initially had jurisdiction over small claims and strata property (condominium) disputes. On April 23, 2018, the government of British Columbia introduced legislation to expand the CRT's jurisdiction to include certain motor vehicle accident disputes, disputes under the Societies Act, and the Co-operative Association Act.

How it works 
The CRT provides the public with access to interactive information pathways, tools, and a variety of dispute resolution methods including negotiation, facilitation and, if necessary, adjudication. Participants use all of these ODR services from a computer or mobile device at a time that is convenient for them. For those who are unable or unwilling to use technology to resolve their dispute, the tribunal provides paper-based or telephone-based services.

Enforcement 
Under section 57 of the Civil Resolution Tribunal Act (CRTA), a validated copy of the CRT’s order can be enforced through the Supreme Court of British Columbia if it is an order for financial compensation or return of personal property over $35,000. Under section 58 of the CRTA, the order can be enforced through the Provincial Court of British Columbia if it is an order for financial compensation or return of personal property under $35,000. Once filed, a CRT order has the same force and effect as an order of the court that it is filed in.

Judicial Review 
Pursuant to section 56.6 of the CRTA, a party may petition the Supreme Court of British Columbia for a judicial review of a CRT decision.  The party must commence an application within 60 days from the date of the CRT decision. In a judicial review, the remedies a court can give are limited. The judge generally focuses on determining whether the tribunal had the authority to make a particular decision and whether the tribunal exercised that authority.  The Supreme Court will not interfere with the CRT Decision unless the Decision is patently unreasonable.

References

External links

Canadian tribunals